Tompojevci (Rusyn: Томпоєвци) is a village and municipality in the Vukovar-Syrmia County in Croatia. 

The village of Tompojevci was first mentioned in the 13th century, in Hungarian documents as Tomteleke. The Croatian name of the village, Tompojevci, appears for the first time in 1581. According to the population census from 1847, Tompojevci had 501 inhabitants, 492 Catholics and 9 Orthodox. 

According to the 2011 census, there are 1,565 inhabitants in the municipality. With pronounced issue of population decline in eastern Croatia caused by population ageing, effects of the Croatian War of Independence and emigration after the accession of Croatia to the European Union, the population of the municipality dropped to 1,116 residents at the time of 2021 census.

The municipality encompasses the Jelaš Forest, where a mass grave containing six bodies and three individual graves of people killed during the Croatian War of Independence were found.  four of the bodies remain unidentified, while the rest were Croatian National Guard soldiers and civilians. A memorial was built at the site in 2013.

Tompojevci is underdeveloped municipality which is statistically classified as the First Category Area of Special State Concern by the Government of Croatia.

Name
The name of the village in Croatian is plural.

Demographics

Ethnic groups in the municipality include (2011 census):
 61.73% Croats 
 17.38% Rusyns
 10.48% Serbs
 9.01% Hungarians

Inhabited places

Municipality contains the villages of Berak, Bokšić, Čakovci, Grabovo, Mikluševci and Tompojevci.

Politics

Mayor of the municipality is Tomislav Panenić.

Languages

In the Municipality of Tompojevci for the territory of the settlement of Mikluševci, where Rusyns make up the majority of the population (of the total of 486 inhabitants 359 are Rusyns), equal use of the Rusyn language has been introduced by the Statute of the Municipality of Tompojevci, and for the settlement of Čakovci in the same Municipality, where Hungarians make up the majority of the population, equal use of the Hungarian language and script has been introduced.

See also
Vukovar-Syrmia County
Syrmia
Church of the Nativity of the Theotokos, Mikluševci
Church of St. Nicholas, Mikluševci
Church of the Presentation of Mary, Čakovci

References

Municipalities of Croatia
Populated places in Syrmia
Populated places in Vukovar-Syrmia County
Rusyn communities